Robert Scholz (23 April 1886 – 10 October 1927) was a German film actor of the silent era. He appeared in 76 films between 1919 and 1928. He was born in Germany and died in Berlin.

Selected filmography

 A Drive into the Blue (1919)
 The White Roses of Ravensberg (1919)
 Die Fluch der Menschheit (1920)
 Der Tanz auf dem Vulkan (1920)
 The White Peacock (1920)
 Der Im Rausche der Milliarden (1920)
 About the Son (1921)
 Count Varenne's Lover (1921)
 Sons of the Night (1921)
 The Experiment of Professor Mithrany (1921)
 Danton (1921)
 The Buried Self (1921)
 Symphony of Death (1921)
 Lola Montez, the King's Dancer (1922)
 Bigamy (1922)
 Barmaid (1922)
 Only One Night (1922)
 Fratricide (1922)
 Yvette, the Fashion Princesss (1922)
 Yellow Star (1922)
 Shame (1922)
 She and the Three (1922)
 Ihre Hoheit die Tänzerin (1922)
 The Ancient Law (1923)
 The Fifth Street (1923)
 Mister Radio (1924)
 The Girl from Capri (1924)
 To a Woman of Honour (1924)
 Darling of the King (1924)
 Fever for Heights (1924)
 Za La Mort (1924)
 The Little Duke (1924)
 The Blackguard (1925)
 Tragedy (1925)
 The Island of Dreams (1925)
 The Flight in the Night (1926)
 Roses from the South (1926)
 Lace (1926)
 The Prince and the Dancer (1926)
 Sword and Shield (1926)
 The Love of Jeanne Ney (1927)
 The Bordello in Rio (1927)
 Flirtation (1927)
 When the Young Wine Blossoms (1927)
 Heads Up, Charley (1927)
 The Queen of Spades (1927)
 Eva and the Grasshopper (1927)
 The False Prince (1927)
 Give Me Life (1928)

References

External links

1886 births
1927 deaths
German male film actors
German male silent film actors
20th-century German male actors